Platylesches affinissima, the bashful hopper or affinity hopper, is a butterfly in the family Hesperiidae. It is found in Senegal, the Gambia, Guinea, Sierra Leone, Ghana, Nigeria, the Republic of the Congo, Tanzania, Malawi, north-western Zambia, Mozambique and eastern Zimbabwe. The habitat consists of Guinea savanna.

Adults feed from the flowers of trees and shrubs. They are on wing year round, but are most common from May to August.

References

Butterflies described in 1921
Erionotini